Marjorie Sewell Holt (September 17, 1920 – January 6, 2018), a Republican, was a U.S. Congresswoman who represented Maryland's 4th congressional district from January 3, 1973, to January 3, 1987. She was the first Republican woman elected to Congress from Maryland. Holt died on January 6, 2018, in Severna Park, Maryland, aged 97.

Early life and education
She was born in Birmingham, Alabama, and attended Jacksonville Junior College (now Jacksonville University). In 1940–1941 she attended the University of Florida College of Law and was admitted to the Florida bar in 1949 and the Maryland bar in 1962, and commenced practice in Anne Arundel County, Maryland

Political career
In 1972, Holt was elected as a Republican to Congress and served from January 3, 1973, to January 3, 1987.  She represented a district that stretched from Brooklyn Park to Eagle Harbor and included Glen Burnie, Annapolis and Crofton. The district also included Andrews Air Force Base. She did not seek reelection in 1986 and resumed the practice of law in Baltimore. She was nominated by President Ronald Reagan to be a member of the General Advisory Committee on Arms Control and Disarmament. She was a resident of Severna Park, Maryland.

See also
 Women in the United States House of Representatives

References

External links
 
Marjorie Sewell Holt papers at the University of Maryland libraries

1920 births
2018 deaths
20th-century American women lawyers
Female members of the United States House of Representatives
Florida lawyers
Jacksonville University alumni
Maryland lawyers
People from Severna Park, Maryland
Politicians from Birmingham, Alabama
Republican Party members of the United States House of Representatives from Maryland
Fredric G. Levin College of Law alumni
Women in Maryland politics
20th-century American lawyers
21st-century American women